Opushteno is a television show in North Macedonia hosted by Toni and Deo on Macedonian Radio Television (MRT) since 2013.

See also
Vo Centar
Milenko Nedelkovski Show

References

Macedonian television series
Macedonian Radio Television original programming